Twice Two is a 1933 American pre-Code Laurel and Hardy short film. It is the second of only three films where the pair each play a dual role: the first is Brats and the third and last is Our Relations.

Plot
A year prior to the first scene, Stan Laurel married Oliver Hardy's sister (played by Oliver), and Oliver married Stan's sister (played by Stan) in a double wedding. They all live together and Stan and Ollie work in the same office. After some gags involving telephones, the wives are seen making preparations for a surprise party to celebrate their first anniversary during which a cake lands on Mrs. Laurel's head, causing her to bear an uncanny resemblance to a portrait of Elizabeth I on the dining room wall. Stan and Ollie then arrive but the couples cannot help but squabble throughout the party. In the final scenes, a delivery boy (played by Charlie Hall) arrives with another cake, which is thrown in Mrs. Laurel's face by an acrimonious Mrs. Hardy.

Cast
 Stan Laurel as Mr. Stan Laurel / Mrs. Sandy Hardy
 Oliver Hardy as Mr. Oliver Hardy / Mrs. Fanny Laurel
 Baldwin Cooke as Soda Jerk (uncredited)
 Charlie Hall as Delivery Boy (uncredited)
 Ham Kinsey as Passerby (uncredited)
 Carol Tevis as Mrs. Sandy Hardy (voice) (uncredited)
 May Wallace as Mrs. Fanny Laurel (voice) (uncredited)

Production 
 The voice of Mrs. Hardy (Stan's sister) is dubbed by Carol Tevis, whose voice is dubbed on the Munchkin singers in the 1939 version of The Wizard of Oz.
 The voice of Mrs. Laurel (Oliver's sister) is dubbed by May Wallace, who also appeared with the duo in County Hospital as a Nurse.
 This is the second time Stan Laurel appears in drag as Oliver Hardy's wife; the first was That's My Wife. Stan also dressed in drag three years earlier in Another Fine Mess, being passed off to prospective house tenants as a maid. Subsequently, Stan would appear in drag twice more, in A Chump at Oxford in 1940 and finally, in Jitterbugs, briefly, as a Boston matron, in 1943.
 Twice Two was the last Laurel & Hardy film directed by James Parrott.

References

External links
 
 
 
 

1933 films
1933 comedy films
American black-and-white films
Films directed by James Parrott
Laurel and Hardy (film series)
1933 short films
American comedy short films
1930s English-language films
1930s American films